Curtis Coulter (born 6 October 1994) is an Irish swimmer. He represented Ireland at the 2019 World Aquatics Championships in Gwangju, South Korea. He competed in the men's 100 metre freestyle event.

He represented Northern Ireland at the 2014 Commonwealth Games held in Glasgow, Scotland and at the 2018 Commonwealth Games held in Gold Coast, Australia.

, he is head coach of Ards Swimming Club in Newtownards, United Kingdom.

References 

Living people
1994 births
Place of birth missing (living people)
Irish male freestyle swimmers
Swimmers at the 2014 Commonwealth Games
Swimmers at the 2018 Commonwealth Games
Commonwealth Games competitors for Northern Ireland
21st-century Irish people